Västra Torup is a minor locality situated in Hässleholm Municipality, Skåne County, Sweden with 198 inhabitants in 2010 down from 210 in 2005, Västra Torup is no longer classified as an urban area by Statistics Sweden.

Attractions 

The Ingelbo Moose Park is located in Hissmossa north of Västra Torup

References 

Populated places in Hässleholm Municipality
Populated places in Skåne County